Włodzimierz Sokorski (2 July 1908, Oleksandrivsk – 2 May 1999, Warsaw) was a Polish communist official, writer, military journalist and a brigadier general in the People's Republic of Poland. He was the Minister of Culture and Art responsible for the implementation of the socialist realist doctrine in Poland. During World War II he escaped to the Soviet Union.

In 1949 at the Congress of Polish Composers in Łagów he banned jazz, after a four-and-a-half-hour diatribe on the "imperialist rot" poisoning people's minds. Following the socialist thaw of the Polish October revolution, Sokorski headed the Polish radio and television committee of the Polish United Workers' Party in the 1960s, and later, the Miesięcznik Literacki ideological monthly magazine (dismantled in 1990).  Despite promoting socialist realism and the line of the PZPR, it is emphasized that as the minister of culture and art, he also saved some writers and people of culture from repression.

He wrote memoirs, novels with strong sexual undertones, and was showered with state medals and awards.

He is buried at the Powązki Military Cemetery in Warsaw.

See also
 Socialist realism in Poland

References

1908 births
1999 deaths
People from Oleksandrivsk
People from Yekaterinoslav Governorate
Communist Party of Poland politicians
Communist Party of the Soviet Union members
Polish Workers' Party politicians
Polish United Workers' Party members
Government ministers of Poland
Members of the State National Council
Members of the Polish Sejm 1947–1952
Members of the Polish Sejm 1952–1956
Members of the Polish Sejm 1965–1969
Members of the Polish Sejm 1969–1972
Members of the Polish Sejm 1972–1976
Polish expatriates in the Soviet Union
Polish male novelists
Polish People's Army generals
Polish military personnel of World War II
Grand Crosses of the Order of Polonia Restituta
Commanders with Star of the Order of Polonia Restituta
Commanders of the Order of Polonia Restituta
Knights of the Order of Polonia Restituta
Recipients of the Gold Cross of the Virtuti Militari
Recipients of the Order of the Builders of People's Poland
Recipients of the Order of the Banner of Work
Recipients of the Order of Lenin
Burials at Powązki Military Cemetery
20th-century Polish novelists